Euclidia consors is a moth of the family Erebidae found in Japan (Honshu).

References

Moths described in 1878
Euclidia